Drinking from a shoe has historically been performed as both a bringer of good fortune, a hazing punishment, or a party piece. Drinking champagne from a lady's slipper became a symbol of decadence in the early 20th century. The practice remains particularly popular in Australia, where it is called (doing) a shoey.

Australian MotoGP rider Jack Miller celebrated his first premier class victory by drinking champagne out of his shoe, at the Dutch circuit of Assen, on 26 June 2016. Since then, Formula One driver Daniel Ricciardo, another Australian, has also performed shoeys on the podium.

Slipper champagne
In the 20th century, the act of drinking champagne from a lady's slipper became a shorthand for decadence and sophistication. The practice is thought to have originated in 1902 at the Everleigh Club, a high-class brothel in Chicago. When a dancer's
slipper fell to the floor, a member of Prince Henry of Prussia's
entourage picked it up and used it to drink champagne.

Military traditions

Drinking from another soldier's boot was a traditional hazing ritual in the German army, and soldiers would drink from the general's boot after a victory. During World War I, German soldiers were said to pass around a leather boot filled with beer, to bring good luck before a battle. The drinkers would flick the boot before and after taking a drink from it.
The idea that drinking from a shoe or boot can bring good fortune dates back to the Middle Ages.

The German Bierstiefel is a boot-shaped beer glass said to have been created by a Prussian general in an unnamed war who promised his troops that if they were victorious in an upcoming battle, he would drink beer from his own boot. After they won the battle the general had second thoughts, and instead ordered a glass imitation to be made.

Shoey
The shoey is particularly popular in, but not limited to, Australia. The drinker either removes their own shoe, or nominates a friend's shoe to be used as the vessel. The shoe is tilted and the entire contents of a can of beer are poured into the shoe's opening.  Once the beverage has settled, the beer is drunk by tipping the shoe up to the mouth and chugging it. The drink most commonly used for a shoey is beer; however, other alcoholic beverages (such as champagne) are also used. Australian Formula One racer Daniel Ricciardo has said: "If the sparkling wine is cold, then it tastes good. If it's warm then you might get the sweat through it but the cold taste kills the bad stuff... so it's delicious."

In 2015, after Supercars driver David Reynolds won the first non-endurance race of his career, he proceeded to drink champagne from his shoe while celebrating on the podium. Also in 2015, DJ Dillon Francis did a shoey on stage at Sydney's Field Day. More international media attention was received in 2016 after MotoGP rider Jack Miller celebrated his first win and drank champagne from his racing boot during the podium presentation. Following a podium at the 2016 San Marino MotoGP round, Italian racer Valentino Rossi was the first non-Australian competitor to embrace and perform a shoey.

Ricciardo repeated the stunt at the following , this time sharing it with Mark Webber. Scottish actor Gerard Butler drank Red Bull from a shoe with Ricciardo at the US Grand Prix podium, as did Patrick Stewart on the podium of the 2017 Canadian Grand Prix. Ricciardo shared his shoey with Canadian rookie driver Lance Stroll on the podium of the 2017 Azerbaijan Grand Prix, which was Stroll's first podium of his F1 career and Ricciardo's fifth win. Ricciardo credits the creation of the shoey to "a few Aussies called the Mad Hueys", saying that they "basically travel the world fishing and surfing and they like to drink a lot of beer – so that's where the shoey began". On the podium of the 2017 Austrian Grand Prix, interviewer Martin Brundle drank from third-placed Ricciardo's shoe, but winner Valtteri Bottas and runner-up Sebastian Vettel declined the offer. The shoey made its return to Formula One at the 2020 Emilia Romagna Grand Prix, where third-place finisher Daniel Ricciardo and race winner Lewis Hamilton drank champagne out of both of Ricciardo's race shoes. He then repeated it at the 2021 Italian Grand Prix, where Ricciardo led a McLaren 1-2, sharing the shoey with his teammate Lando Norris and McLaren CEO Zak Brown.

Australian cricketer Andrew Tye had promised to do the shoey if his team Kings XI Punjab would have won the Indian Premier League in 2019.

The shoey was popular during the Cronulla-Sutherland Sharks 2016 season when it became a tradition for fans to perform shoeys at games. This coincided with the club winning their first NRL premiership at the end of the season, with numerous players such as James Maloney doing shoeys at celebrations.

Commonly, Hash House Harriers who wear new shoes to an event can be required to drink from that shoe.

After ultramarathoner Des Linden won the 2018 Boston Marathon, she drank champagne from one of her running shoes. She did the same after setting the women's world record 50k time.

Australian MMA fighter Tai Tuivasa is known for doing shoeys immediately after his victories. Tai Tuivasa once again celebrated the shoey after his second-round knockout of Derrick Lewis; thus, stapling (as it's called) is his signature win celebration.

In 2021, Australian cricketers Matthew Wade and Marcus Stoinis did a shoey to celebrate after winning the T20 World Cup on 14th November.

In February 2022, New Zealand racing driver Scott McLaughlin celebrated his first win in IndyCar at St. Petersburg with a shoey, using a can of beer in lieu of champagne.

In April 2022, the AFLW coach for Brisbane, Craig Starcevich, did a shoey after being coaxed into doing one by Emily Bates to celebrate being voted as the league's best and fairest player for 2022.

In December 2022, WWE Superstar Grayson Waller celebrated his win in the Iron Survivor Challenge at NXT Deadline with a shoey. 

In February 2023, popular singer Harry Styles did a shoey during his musical concert at HBF park, Perth, Western Australia.

Ancient traditions 
Several ancient Islamic hadiths depict people offering water to animals in their shoes. One medieval Ethiopian story depicts the Virgin Mary kindly offering water to a thirsty dog in her shoe.

References

2014 establishments in Australia
2010s fads and trends
Drinking culture
Surf culture
Australian humour